Francis Greville, 3rd Baron Brooke (died November 1658) supported the Parliamentary (Roundhead) cause in the English Civil War.

Biography
Francis Greville was the eldest son and heir of Robert Greville, 2nd Baron Brooke and his wife Catharine, daughter of Francis Russell, 4th Earl of Bedford.

Greville served as recorder of Warwick.

Greville died unmarried in 1658, and was succeeded in turn by his two brothers, Robert, 4th Baron Brooke, (died 1676) and Fulke, 5th Baron Brooke (died 22 Oct 1710).

Notes

References

 endnote:

1658 deaths
3
Francis
Year of birth unknown